Fosterella is a genus of plants in the family Bromeliaceae, subfamily Pitcairnioideae. It contains 31 recognized species, 30 native to central and western South America, one to Mesoamerica. The genus is named after Mulford B. Foster, American horticulturist and collector (1888-1978).

Species
 Fosterella albicans (Grisebach) L.B. Smith - Bolivia, Argentina
 Fosterella aletroides (L.B. Smith) L.B. Smith - Peru
 Fosterella batistana Ibisch, Leme & J.Peters - Pará
 Fosterella caulescens Rauh  - Bolivia
 Fosterella chaparensis Ibisch, R. Vásquez & E. Gross  - Bolivia
 Fosterella christophii Ibisch, R.Vásquez & J.Peters   - Bolivia
 Fosterella cotacajensis Kessler, Ibisch & E. Gross   - Bolivia
 Fosterella elviragrossiae Ibisch, R.Vásquez & J.Peters  - Bolivia
 Fosterella floridensis Ibisch, R. Vásquez & E. Gross  - Bolivia
 Fosterella gracilis (Rusby) L.B. Smith  - Bolivia
 Fosterella graminea (L.B. Smith) L.B. Smith  - Bolivia
 Fosterella hatschbachii L.B. Smith & R.W. Read - Mato Grosso
 Fosterella heterophylla Rauh - Bolivia
 Fosterella kroemeri Ibisch, R.Vásquez & J.Peters - Bolivia
 Fosterella micrantha (Lindley) L.B. Smith - Mexico (Nuevo León, Veracruz, Chiapas, Oaxaca, Guerrero), Guatemala, El Salvador
 Fosterella nicoliana J.Peters & Ibisch - Peru
 Fosterella pearcei (Baker) L.B. Smith  - Bolivia
 Fosterella penduliflora (C.H. Wright) L.B. Smith  - Bolivia, Peru, Argentina
 Fosterella petiolata (Mez) L.B. Smith - Bolivia, Peru
 Fosterella rexiae Ibisch, R. Vásquez & E. Gross - Bolivia
 Fosterella robertreadii Ibisch & J. Peters - Peru
 Fosterella rojasii (L.B. Smith) L.B. Smith - Paraguay, Bolivia
 Fosterella rusbyi (Mez) L.B. Smith  - Bolivia, Peru
 Fosterella schidosperma (Baker) L.B. Smith - Peru
 Fosterella spectabilis H. Luther  - Bolivia
 Fosterella vasquezii E. Gross & Ibisch  - Bolivia
 Fosterella villosula (Harms) L.B. Smith  - Bolivia
 Fosterella weberbaueri (Mez) L.B. Smith - Bolivia, Peru
 Fosterella weddelliana (Brongniart ex Baker) L.B. Smith  - Bolivia
 Fosterella windischii L.B. Smith & R.W. Read - Mato Grosso, Bolivia
 Fosterella yuvinkae Ibisch, R. Vásquez, E. Gross & S. Reichle - Bolivia

References

External links
 BSI Genera Gallery photos

 
Bromeliaceae genera